Pacifica Graduate Institute is a private for-profit graduate school with two campuses near Santa Barbara, California. The institute offers masters and doctoral degrees in the fields of clinical psychology, counseling, mythological studies, depth psychology, and the humanities. The institute is accredited by the WASC Senior College and University Commission.

History
Pacifica Graduate Institute dates its life as an educational institution from the 1976 inauguration of a nine-month para-professional Counseling Skills Certificate program offered by the Human Relations Center. The institute's original name was the Human Relations Institute.

The M.A. in Counseling Psychology was initiated in 1982. In 1984 the institute announced a new M.A. Counseling Psychology program with an emphasis in depth psychology. The program was launched in 1984 by Stan Passy, who drew on his doctoral work in archetypal psychology with James Hillman at the University of Dallas. Faculty and visiting lecturers have included Marion Woodman, Thomas Moore, Robert A. Johnson, and Marija Gimbutas.

The name of the school was changed to the Pacifica Graduate Institute in 1989.

One of the supporters of the institute's vision in the early years was the mythologist Joseph Campbell. He offered guidance to the school's founders and appeared many times as a guest speaker at the institute's public conference series. After his death, his widow, Jean Erdman Campbell, felt that Pacifica would be able to carry Campbell's work into the future and, thus, would be the most appropriate home for his archives. She donated his 3,000-book library and archival collection to the Center for the Study of Depth Psychology, an independent non-profit organization housed at the Pacifica campus, which evolved into the Opus Archives and Research Center. The Joseph Campbell Archives and Library were installed in the school's Seminar Building and the home of the collection was formally dedicated in 1992.

The mythological studies program was created in 1994 by Jonathan Young, building on his work as founding curator of the Joseph Campbell Archives. The program combines folklore, literature, creative studies, and archetypal psychology.

Reaching full capacity for Santa Barbara County permitted operations at the Lambert Road campus in 1999, Pacifica began offering additional sections of existing programs at La Casa de Maria's newly established Ladera Lane Retreat Center (site of a former Jesuit novitiate). Pacifica became a two-campus school by purchasing the Ladera Lane center from La Casa de Maria in September 2005.

The Engaged Humanities & Creative Life program, along with the Jungian & Archetypal Studies specialization of the M.A./Ph.D. program are the two online/hybrid programs Pacifica offers, with the majority of coursework accomplished online by students. The online studies are combined with quarterly four-day visits either on campus or at the New York Open Center. All other degrees are completed in monthly three-day or four-day retreats and one summer week annually.

Academics
The institute offers Masters of Arts, Psy.D., and Ph.D. degrees. Pacifica's academic programs are all subject to review and approval on multiple levels by the Western Association of Schools and Colleges (WASC) Senior College and University Commission (WSCUC), the State of California Board of Private Postsecondary Education (BPPE), and U. S. Department of Education (DOE). Pacifica's M.A. in Counseling Psychology program provides its mission statements, program goals, student learning outcomes, and time to completion rates. The Ph.D. in Clinical Psychology program provides its mission statements, program goals, student learning outcomes, and time to completion rates as well. Pacifica's Clinical Psychology programs, along with all other Pacifica degree programs, are accredited by WASC.

In September 2013 and March 2014, groups of former and current Ph.D. students from the clinical psychology program filed a lawsuit stating that the school misrepresented its APA accreditation status. They alleged negligent and intentional misrepresentation, concealment and unfair business practices, according to the complaint. Pacifica responded that the claims were without merit. Pacifica has never said that its degree programs in clinical psychology are accredited by the APA, an independent regulatory body. While some states and jurisdictions require graduation from an APA accredited school for licensure to practice as a clinical psychologist, California, where Pacifica is located, does not require APA accreditation.

The California Board of Behavioral Sciences reports that 85% of the Pacifica graduates taking the MFT standard written exam from 1/1/2015-6/30/2015 passed the exam, which ranks higher than the state average of 65% for that time period. Clinical psychology graduates had a 100% pass rate on the California Psychology Supplemental Examination (CPSE) exam from 1/1/14 to 12/31/14 and had an 85% pass rate on the Examination for Professional Practice of Psychology (EPPP) from 1/1/14 to 12/31/14.

Public programs

Pacifica's public programs explore the fields of psychology and mythological studies through the lens of depth psychology. Programs cover a wide range of topics from humanities and culture to counseling and clinical psychology. Most of the public programs offer continuing education units for professionals in the field. These events are open to the general public with the intention of bringing Pacifica's educational resources to the wider community. Past presenters include Joseph Campbell, Jean Houston, Michael J. Meade, Huston Smith, Malidoma Patrice Somé, Sonu Shamdasani, Thomas Moore, Marion Woodman, James Hillman, and Robert Bly.

Campuses
Pacifica's two campus locations are within three miles of each other in the foothills of the Santa Barbara suburbs. The 13 acre Lambert Road Campus is the former Max Fleishman estate. Each campus contains multiple gardens, while the Lambert Campus hosts the larger Organic Garden.

Graduate Research Library 
Pacifica Graduate Institute's library resources and services support graduate-level study in the areas of counseling psychology, clinical psychology, depth psychology, depth psychotherapy, mythological studies, and humanities. Subject area strengths are in Jungian and archetypal psychology, depth psychology, psychoanalysis, clinical psychology, mythology, religious studies, psychological studies of literature, and research methodology. The Graduate Research Libraries on the Lambert and Ladera campuses contain over 23,000 books, provide access to over 100,000 ebooks, 2,900 theses and dissertations, and 1,000 audio and video materials. They also provide access to thousands of journals, both in print and electronic formats. Special reference collections include faculty publications, rare and hard-to-find books, and other unique multimedia materials. The library also maintains an archive of open access digitized audio faculty lectures on various topics from prior years, stored in the Internet Archive. Lectures can be downloaded in different file formats or listened-to online.

Bookstore 
The institute's bookstore stocks over 5,000 book titles focused on Depth psychology, Archetypal psychology, the humanities, and mythology. The bookstore is located on both Pacifica Graduate Institute campuses in Montecito and Carpinteria.

Alumni association
Pacifica Graduate Institute Alumni Association (PGIAA) was formed on 17 April 2013. PGIAA is a California 501(c) Nonprofit Corporation for the purposes of developing an operational and charitable membership association that supports both the alumni (of Pacifica Graduate Institute and the wider community to develop their intellectual, spiritual, altruistic, and professional capabilities. The association has more than 5,000 members and over 30 regional chapters across the United States and Canada.

OPUS Archives 
A not-for-profit organization with facilities on both Pacifica campuses, Opus Archives and Research Center works to preserve, develop, and extend the archival collections and libraries of eminent scholars in the fields of depth psychology, mythology, and the humanities. Opus makes these collections available to researchers, scholars, students, and the general public for research. To fulfill its mission of functioning as a living archive, Opus also offers scholarships, research grants, educational programs, and community events.

Joseph Campbell Collection at OPUS 

Joseph Campbell's papers and collections were entrusted to the OPUS Archives and Research Center on the campuses of Pacifica Graduate Institute. Campbell's papers have since been moved to The New York Public Library. The renowned author, scholar, and mythologist was a long-time friend of Pacifica and a frequent guest lecturer. After Campbell's death, Jean Erdman Campbell and the Joseph Campbell Foundation donated his papers, books and other effects to the Center for the Study of Depth Psychology at Pacifica. The center became OPUS Archives and Research Center and is the home of Campbell's library. The founding curator, Jonathan Young, worked closely with Jean Erdman Campbell to gather the materials from Campbell's homes in Honolulu and Greenwich Village, New York City. Campbell's library features approximately 3,000 volumes and covers a broad range of subjects including anthropology, folklore, religion, literature, and psychology. Campbell's papers, now housed at The New York Public Library, include lectures, original manuscripts, and research papers. The mission of Opus Archives and the Research Center is to preserve, develop, and extend to the world the archival collections and libraries of eminent scholars in the fields of depth psychology, mythology and the humanities. The center is a living archive, supporting interdisciplinary dialogue, education, grants, research opportunities and public programs.

Marija Gimbutas Collection at OPUS 
OPUS holds over 15,000 slides utilized by Marija Gimbutas in her lectures and books on Neolithic civilizations and the goddess, thousands of research catalogue cards in numerous languages handwritten by Gimbutas, and extensive texts on the subjects of history, archaeology, and the humanities.

James Hillman Collection at OPUS 
James Hillman's collection includes first draft manuscripts of his books, including Re-Visioning Psychology, which earned him a nomination for the Pulitzer Prize. Hillman's prolific career is documented through correspondence, personal notes, and unfinished projects that are available for pursuit by scholars of the next generation.

Marion Woodman Collection at OPUS 
Marion Woodman's collection includes manuscripts, lectures, and correspondence. Throughout her career Woodman focused on the relationship of psyche and soma and this specialization, particularly as it manifested in the experiences and lives of women, was groundbreaking in the field of Jungian studies.

Faculty 
Pacifica's PlumX installation provides a story of Pacifica's faculty scholarship and publication impact, by means of altmetrics. Profiles for core, distinguished, and visiting faculty provide cumulative insights into how faculty research is interacted with, shared, commented on, purchased, and disseminated in both print and electronic format. PlumX gathers and brings together metrics for all types of scholarly research output, including published books, journal articles, conference papers, videos, data sets, interviews, and other online web resources. Pacifica's PlumX installation categorizes Pacifica metrics into 5 separate types: usage (e.g. downloads and library holdings), captures (e.g. bookmarks, favorites, readers, watchers), mentions (e.g. blog posts, comments, reviews), social media (e.g. likes, shares, tweets), and citations (how many times research has been cited).

References

External links

 Official website

Educational institutions established in 1976
Universities and colleges in Santa Barbara County, California
Schools accredited by the Western Association of Schools and Colleges
1976 establishments in California
Private universities and colleges in California